The Barauni–Gorakhpur, Raxaul and Jainagar lines are a set of three lines connecting Barauni in the Indian state of Bihar with Gorakhpur in Uttar Pradesh. The lines run in an east–west direction between the Ganges and India-Nepal border, covering northern Bihar west of the Kosi river and eastern Uttar Pradesh. The southernmost of the lines connects via Hajipur Junction, Sonpur Junction and Chhapra. The central line connects via Muzaffarpur, Motihari and Sugauli. The northern line connects via Darbhanga, Sitamarhi and Raxaul. The lines have interconnections between them and the northern line has extensions to places near the India–Nepal border.

History
Railway lines in the area were pioneered by Tirhut Railway and the Bengal and North Western Railway lines in the 19th century.  In his book The Indian Empire, Its People, History and Products (first published in 1886) W.W.Hunter, says "The Tirhut State Railway with its various branches  intersects Northern Behar and is intended to extend to the Nepal frontier  on one side and to Assam on the other."

The area was developed with metre-gauge tracks. The  Samastipur–Narkatiaganj loop was developed in stages between 1875 and 1907. The Samastipur–Darbhanga line was opened for famine relief in 1874 and opened to the public on 1 November 1875. The -long Nirmali branch (Darbhanga–Nirmali) between 1883 and 1886. The Barauni–Bachhwara line was opened in 1883. The Bachhwara–Bagaha line was developed in stages between 1883 and 1907. The Sakri–Jainagar branch was opened in 1905. The -long Hajipur–Muzaffarpur line was opened in 1884. The -long Tirhut main line from Katihar to Sonpur was developed in stages between 1887 and 1901. The -long Chhapra–Thawe line was opened in 1910. The -long Chhapra–Allahabad line was developed between 1891 and 1913. The Maharajganj branch line was opened in 1907. The Siwan–Kaptanganj line was opened between 1907 and 1913. The -long Bhatni–Varanasi Chord was opened between 1896 and 1899. The Jhanjharpur–Laukaha Bazar line was opened in 1976.

The lines were converted to  broad gauge in phases starting from early 1980s. Samastipur to Darbhanga (metre to broad gauge) was converted around 1983. Siwan to Thawe (metre to broad gauge) was converted in early 2006. The Sakri–Laukaha Bazar–Nirmali conversion is under process.

Sections

 Barauni–Samastipur section
 Samastipur–Muzaffarpur section
 Muzaffarpur–Hajipur section
 Muzaffarpur–Gorakhpur section

New lines
New lines being constructed in the area include: 

Bridge links
The Ganges divides the state of Bihar in two parts. The construction of the -long Rajendra Setu in 1959 provided the first opportunity to link the railway tracks on the north and south banks of the Ganges.

The -long Ganga Rail-Road Bridge, opened from 3 February 2016,  links Sonpur and Parmanandpur to Pahlezaghat Junction on north side of bridge to Patliputra Junction on south side of bridge to Patna.

References

External links

|

5 ft 6 in gauge railways in India
Rail transport in Bihar

Transport in Jainagar
Transport in Gorakhpur district
Transport in Raxaul
Transport in Barauni
Railway lines in Uttar Pradesh